WVTJ (610 AM) is a radio station broadcasting a Gospel format.  Licensed to Pensacola, Florida, United States, the station serves the Pensacola area.  The station is owned by Pensacola Radio Corporation and features programming from Salem Communications.

References

External links

Gospel radio stations in the United States
VTJ
VTJ
Radio stations established in 1965
1965 establishments in Florida